Wairarapa TV is a television station in New Zealand that transmits in the Wairarapa area of the North Island.

Wairarapa TV began transmitting in the Wairarapa on 24 October 2016. The channel is a Freeview regional channel covering Masterton, Carterton, Greytown, Featherston and Martinborough.

The channel broadcasts on Freeview Channel 41 from Popoiti Hill in Carterton. It broadcasts more than 50% locally generated television content via its partner More FM. The channel is funded  and supported by Noise Productions Ltd, Trust House Ltd, The Wairarapa Times-Age, Media Works Wairarapa and Wairarapa Bush Rugby.

Wairarapa TV has no permanent staff and is fully automated using technology  developed by founder Toby Mills.  In 2018, Wairarapa TV signed a technology and content sharing agreement with Changchun Television in China.

In 2018, with the demolition of the Empire Lodge, the previous home of Arrow FM, Wairarapa TV moved  into a new shared premises with Arrow FM at Radio House in Masterton.

References 

Television stations in New Zealand